Soi Arab is an alleyway in Bangkok. It is a center for Middle Eastern visitors and expatriates, with numerous Arab restaurants and shops. The official name of the street is Soi Sukhumvit 3/1, located between Soi Sukhumvit 3 and Soi Sukhumvit 5, not far from the Nana Plaza nightlife area and the Grace Hotel popular among Arabs. Several restaurants in the area offer outdoors water pipe smoking, and shops offer expensive agarwood for sale.

References

Streets in Bangkok